Lycastrirhyncha is a genus of 5 neotropical flower flies or hoverflies.

Species
L. mexicana Curran, 1930e
L. nitens Bigot, 1859 - type species.
L. quinta Doesburg, 1963
L. titillans Hull, 1944
L. willistonii Coquillett, 1902

References

Diptera of North America
Diptera of South America
Hoverfly genera
Taxa named by Jacques-Marie-Frangile Bigot